"Giants" is a song recorded by English band Take That for their eighth studio album, Wonderland (2017). It was written by Gary Barlow, Howard Donald, Mark Owen, Jamie Norton and Ben Mark, while the production was done by Mark Ralph. It was released as the lead single from Wonderland on 17 February 2017 through Polydor Records.

Background and release 

The lead single from the album, titled "Giants", was released on 17 February 2017. It was written by Gary Barlow, Howard Donald, Mark Owen, Jamie Norton and Ben Mark. The production of the song was handled by Mark Ralph, who had previously produced songs for Clean Bandit and Years & Years. In addition, Ralph also provided the bass, guitars, synthesizers and the programming. Drew Smith and Tom AD Fuller, served as the song's engineers, whilst Charlie Russel did the additional engineering and the keys programming. Fuller also provided additional backing vocals alongside Geoff Holroyde. The mixing of "Giants" was done by Mark "Spike" Stent, with Geoff Swan serving as the mixing assistant. The strings were recorded at the Abbey Road Studios in London. Will Malone was the string arranger and conductor whilst Perry Montague-Mason was the string leader. Isobel Griffiths served as conductor and Susie Gillis provided assistance in the process. Tim Young did the mastering at the Metropolis Studios in London.

Critical reception
In his review of the song, Nicholas Reilly of the British newspaper Metro called it "ready-made for arenas" and stated, "It’s a welcome return to their penchant for huge choruses that are tailor made for cavernous arenas. It’s also got a damn catchy chorus too that wouldn't be too far out of place on a recent Coldplay album."

Music video
The song's music video was directed by Mat Whitecross.

Chart performance
The single debuted at 13 in the UK, becoming Take That's 24th UK top 20 single. However, it was the week's highest selling physical release. It performed well on the Scottish charts, entering the top 10 at number 6, whilst it also reached 86 on the Irish chart.

Credits and personnel 
Credits adapted from "Giants" physical CD single.

Locations
 Strings recorded at Abbey Road Studios in London
 Mastering at Metropolis Studios in London

Personnel

 Gary Barlow – vocals, writing
 Howard Donald – vocals, writing
 Mark Owen – vocals, writing
 Mark Ralph – production, bass, guitars, synthesizers, programming 
 Jamie Norton – writing
 Ben Mark – writing
 Drew Smith – engineering
 Tom AD Fuller – engineering, backing vocals
 Charlie Russel – additional engineering, keys programming
 Mark "Spike" Stent – mixing
 Geoff Swan – mixing assistant
 Will Malone – strings arranger and conductor
 Perry Montague-Mason – string leader
 Isobel Griffiths – string contractor
 Susie Gillis – assistant string contractor
 Tim Young – mastering
 Geoff Holroyde – backing vocals, drums

Charts

Certifications

References 

2017 singles
Take That songs
Songs written by Gary Barlow
Songs written by Howard Donald
Songs written by Mark Owen
Songs written by Ben Mark
Songs written by Jamie Norton
Polydor Records singles
2017 songs
Song recordings produced by Mark Ralph (record producer)
Music videos directed by Mat Whitecross